Akimbo may refer to:
 Akimbo (album), a 2000 album by Friendly
 "Arms akimbo" refers to placing hands on hips, arms bent at the elbows which are pointing outward, often in a standing position
 Akimbo (band), an American hardcore band
 Dual wield, the technique of using two weapons, one in each hand, during combat
 Akimbo (on-demand service), a defunct video-on-demand system
 Akimbo Systems, Inc., a defunct software company which produced and sold the FullWrite Professional word processor
 Akimbo, a podcast by Seth Godin